"Swervin" is a song by American rapper and singer A Boogie wit da Hoodie featuring fellow American rapper 6ix9ine from the former's second studio album Hoodie SZN, released on December 21, 2018. The song was written by the artists alongside Aubrey Robinson, Kevin Richardson, Roark Bailey, and producer London on da Track. The song was released as the album's second single along with an official video on July 2, 2019, omitting 6ix9ine and his verse. In the German-language states, "Swervin" was re-released with German rapper Veysel on July 26, 2019.

Music video
The song's official video was released on July 2, 2019. 6ix9ine does not appear in the video, nor does his verse.

Synopsis
The video opens with A Boogie trapped on an airplane that just blew its engine. From there, the visual switches to him interacting with the female lead and cuts to various other scenes. Complex found similarities between Destiny's Child's "Say My Name" video and noted that the video's scenes "are spliced together in a way that follows the trajectory of A Boogie's lyrics".

Chart performance
"Swervin" peaked the highest in Belgium, where it reached number 19. The second highest peak was in Canada, where it peaked at number 24. The song was certified Platinum in Canada by Music Canada on March 5, 2019 and certified 5× Platinum in the United States by the RIAA for selling more than 5,000,000 copies on February 10, 2022.

Charts

Weekly charts

Year-end charts

Certifications

References

2018 singles
2018 songs
A Boogie wit da Hoodie songs
Songs written by 6ix9ine
Songs written by London on da Track
Song recordings produced by London on da Track
Songs written by A Boogie wit da Hoodie

6ix9ine songs